Change Bridge is a Grade II listed single-arch changeline bridge spanning what was formerly a section of the Lancaster Canal in the English market town of Kendal, Cumbria. The structure dates to around 1817. Horses pulling laden barges crossed from one side of the canal to the other, to avoid the coal wharves on the northwestern side of the bridge. It now carries Garden Road, and is believed to be the only change bridge in Cumbria.

The bridge is probably the work of John Fletcher, based on earlier designs by John Rennie the Elder. Rennie's route for the canal was authorised in 1792.

It is constructed of squared coursed limestone with limestone voussoirs. Ramped paths lead to and from either side, with the cobblestones of the western ramp still intact.

Kendal Civic Society restored the bridge in 2002 to celebrate the Golden Jubilee of Queen Elizabeth II.

See also
Listed buildings in Kendal

References

Grade II listed buildings in Cumbria
Bridges in Cumbria
Stone bridges in England
Road bridges in England
Bridges completed in the 19th century
19th-century establishments in England
Kendal